Taren Point is a small suburb, in southern Sydney, in the state of New South Wales, Australia 20 kilometres south of the Sydney central business district in the local government area of the Sutherland Shire.

Surrounded by the suburbs of Sylvania Waters and Caringbah, Taren Point is on the peninsula where the Captain Cook Bridge crosses north over the Georges River to Sans Souci, in the St George area.

It contains a mix of residential, commercial and some industrial areas. The residential area is located along the bank of the Georges River, at the mouth of Botany Bay. Most of the commercial and industrial areas are centred on Taren Point Road and to the east towards Woolooware Bay.

History
Taren Point was originally called Comyns Point, then Cummins Point and later Commins Point, believed to be after a local resident. The origins of Taren Point are also unclear. Thomas Holt (1811–88) owned the land that stretched from Sutherland to Cronulla and his name is commemorated with Holt Road.

There was a cane toad outbreak in Taren Point in 2010, which was controlled by 2014. No cane toads have been identified in the area since.

Landmarks
 Taren Point Public School
 Gwawley Oval, home of Taren Point Touch Football Association
 Woolooware Shores Anglican Retirement Villages, Diocese of Sydney
 Apsley Field, home ground of the Giants Baseball Club
 Taren Point Bowling Club, home of the Taren Point Power

Commercial area
Commercial developments include Winning Appliances, Harvey Norman Business Centre, Flower Power, Officeworks, Transdev NSW bus depot, The Rec Club.

In the 1990s, shops specialising in hardware, furniture, bulky goods and electrical goods drew customers to the industrial area of Taren Point.

Population
English was stated as the only language spoken at home by 74.6% of residents and the most common other languages spoken were Greek (8.6%), Cantonese (1.8%), Arabic (1.7%) and Italian (1.6%). The most common responses for religious affiliation were Anglican (30.6%), Catholic (22.7%) and Orthodox (14.2%).

Gallery

References

Suburbs of Sydney
Botany Bay
Sutherland Shire